Rupt-devant-Saint-Mihiel (literally Rupt before Saint-Mihiel) is a commune in the Meuse department in Grand Est in north-eastern France.

See also
Communes of the Meuse department

References

Ruptdevantsaintmihiel